This is a list of University of Western Sydney people, including alumni and staff.

Alumni

Academia
 Christopher Kelen, author, lecturer in creative writing and literature at the University of Macau
 Mireille Astore, artist/lecturer, Sydney College of the Arts (University of Sydney)
 Nada Kakabadse, professor, University of Northampton
 Chris Fleming, senior lecturer, Western Sydney University 
 Silma Ihram, political academic
 Syed Ziaur Rahman, Secretary and Chair of the Advisory Council, International Association of Medical Colleges & Professor, Jawaharlal Nehru Medical College, Aligarh
 Hollis Taylor, zoomusicologist
Dinesh Wadiwel, senior lecturer in Human Rights and Socio-Legal Studies at the University of Sydney

Business
 Matt Granfield, Head of Marketing, Heritage Bank

Politicians

Federal politicians
 Ed Husic, MP,  Minister for Industry and Science and the Member of the Australian House of Representatives representing Chifley.

State politicians
 David Elliott, MP, member of the New South Wales Legislative Assembly representing Baulkham Hills
 Geoff Lee, MP, member of the New South Wales Legislative Assembly representing Parramatta
 Karyn Paluzzano, former member of the New South Wales Legislative Assembly
 Jai Rowell, MP, member of the New South Wales Legislative Assembly representing Wollondilly
 Ron Wells, former member of the Victorian Legislative Assembly and the Victorian Legislative Assembly
 Steve Whan, MLC, member of New South Wales Legislative Council

Other politicians
 Azis Syamsuddin, Indonesian politician
 Yaw Shin Leong, former Singaporean politician

Humanities

Arts
 Craig Anderson, television actor
 Alfio Bonanno, musician
 Jonathan Boulet, musician
 Melissa Chiu, museum director, curator and author, Hirshhorn Museum and Sculpture Garden
 Dagmar Evelyn Cyrulla, artist
 Kieran Darcy-Smith, actor and director
 Chua Ek Kay, artist
 Nicole da Silva, actress
 Alexandra Davies, actress
 Joel Edgerton, actor
 Joelle Hadjia, musician
 Don Hany, actor
 Steve Le Marquand, actor
 Ben Quilty, artist, 2011 Archibald Prize winner
 Michelle Ronksley-Pavia, artist
 Yvonne Strahovski, actress
 Jared Turner, actor
 The Umbilical Brothers, comedy duo
 David Wenham, actor
 Darren Yap, actor and director

Education
 Maylea Gibson, educator
 Rebecca Harvey, educator
 Lance Mitchell, educator
 Andre Monardo, educator
 William Wallace, educator

History
 Matthew Glozier, historian

Journalism and media
 Whitney Fitzsimmons, television presenter, ABC International
 Paul Murray, radio presenter

Law
 His Honour Magistrate Imad Abdul-Karim
 Her Honour Magistrate Janine Lacy 
 Mr Paresh Khandhar SC

Literature, writing and poetry
 Anne Deveson, writer
 Matt Granfield, author
 Anita Heiss, writer
 Damian McDonald, author
 Granaz Moussavi, poet and director
 Ben Peek, author
 Margaret Roc, author
 Rosie Scott, author
 Travis S. Taylor, science fiction author
 Tony Walters, director and creator of Double the Fist

Sciences

Medicine
 Syed Ziaur Rahman, pharmacologist

Military
 Garnet Malley, Wing Commander, graduate of the Hawkesbury Agricultural College

Sport
 Shannon Cole, Western Sydney Wanderers defender (degree on hold)
 Casey Dunning, rugby union player
 Benny Elias, rugby league player with Balmain Tigers
 Morgan Endicott-Davies, Judo
 Aziz "Zyzz" Shavershian, bodybuilder and internet celebrity
 Francis Vaiotu, NRL player for the Sydney Roosters
 Frank Puletua, New Zealand rugby league footballer

Other
 John Ondawame, activist
 Lancelot Eric Richdale, amateur ornithologist, graduate of the Hawkesbury Agricultural College

Administration

Chancellor

 Gabrielle Harrison – Deputy Chancellor
 Kim Yeadon – Deputy Chancellor

Vice-Chancellor

Faculty
Notable past and current faculty members include:

 Ien Ang, cultural studies academic and author
 Jack Barbalet, sociologist
 David Burchell, journalist
 Jane Caro, social commentator and writer
 Roger Dean, musician, biochemist and cognitive scientist
 Jim Falk, physicist
 Jane R. Goodall, author
 Robert Hayes, legal academic
 Bob Hodge, linguist
 Niv Horesh, historian
 Ivor Indyk, literary academic, editor and publisher
 Paul James, writer on globalization, sustainability, and social theory
 Gail Jones, novelist
 Colm Kearney, political economist
 Steve Keen, economist
 Caleb Kelly, curator and author
 Nikolas Kompridis, philosopher and political theorist
 Geoff Lee, former business academic
 Herbert W. Marsh, educational psychologist
 Willard McCarty, digital humanities academic
 Andrew Moore, historian
 Gerald Muench, medical scientist
 Adam Possamai, sociologist
 Juan Francisco Salazar, anthropologist
 Ariel Salleh, philosopher and sociologist
 Brian Sully , legal academic
 Bryan Turner, sociologist
 Ragbir Bhathal, astronomer and author

References

Western Sydney

University of Western Sydney